Andhra Pradesh is an official monthly magazine brought by the Department of Information and Public Relations Department of Government of Andhra Pradesh. The magazine was started in 1952. It is published in English, Telugu and Urdu languages from Hyderabad. The magazine provides information regarding developmental activities undertaken by the Government of Andhra Pradesh. It also features interesting articles of personality development, humor, career counselling, entertainment, short stories and poetry. There is an online edition of the magazine.

References

External links
Andhra Pradesh magazine

1952 establishments in India
Government of Andhra Pradesh
Monthly magazines published in India
News magazines published in India
Magazines established in 1952
Mass media in Andhra Pradesh
Mass media in Hyderabad, India
Multilingual magazines
State media

Telugu-language magazines